The 2013–14 MOL Liga season was the sixth season of the MOL Liga. The league is a multi-national ice hockey league consisting of teams from Hungary, Romania, and Slovakia. Balázs Ladányi from Dunaújvárosi Acélbikák was the season's leading scorer with 63 points.

Results
Game by game results can be viewed here

Standings

Playoffs

References

External links
 MOL Liga official website

2
Erste Liga (ice hockey) seasons
2